Events from the year 1672 in literature.

Events
January 25 – London's Theatre Royal, Drury Lane, is destroyed by fire. The King's Company moves to the theatre at Lincoln's Inn Fields, which the rival Duke's Company left the previous year.
June – Thomas Killigrew mounts another all-female production of his The Parson's Wedding with the King's Company. (The first occurred in 1664.) Beaumont and Fletcher's Philaster and Dryden's The Maiden Queen are also staged with all-women casts new prologues by Dryden for the productions.
September 13 – John Bunyan is released after twelve years' imprisonment for preaching without a licence.
December – John Dryden's play Marriage à la Mode first performed in London by the King's Company.
The Mercure de France is first published, under the title Mercure galant.

New books

Prose
Nicolás Antonio – Bibliotheca Hispana Nova
Nicolas Denys – Description Géographique et Historique des Costes de l’Amérique Septentrionale (Description and Natural History of the Coasts of North America)
Richard Cumberland – De legibus naturae (On natural laws)
Melchor Fuster – Conceptos predicables
Gadla Walatta Petros (Ethiopian hagiography in Ge'ez language)
Nathaniel Hodges – Loimologia
James Janeway – A Token for Children, Part 2
John Milton – Art of Logic
Pierre Nicole – A Discourse Against Plays and Romances
César Vichard de Saint-Réal – Dom Carlos

Drama
Anonymous – Emilia (adapted from the Costanza di Rosamondo of Aurelio Aureli)
Anonymous – The Illustrious Slaves
Pedro Calderon de la Barca
Eco y Narciso
El hijo del sol, Faetón
La niña de Gómez Arias
Thomas Corneille – Ariane
John Dryden
The Assignation
Marriage à la mode (first performed; published the following year)
John Lacy (published)
The Dumb Lady, or The Farrier Made Physician
The Old Troop, or Monsier Ragou
Molière – Les Femmes Savantes
Henry Nevil Payne – The Morning Ramble
Jean Racine – Bajazet
Edward Ravenscroft – The Citizen Turned Gentleman
Thomas Shadwell 
Epsom Wells
The Miser
George Villiers, 2nd Duke of Buckingham, and others – The Rehearsal (published)

Poetry
Miguel de Barrios – El coro de las musas

Births
January 18 – Antoine Houdar de la Motte, French writer, (died 1731)
March – Sir Richard Steele, Irish dramatist, satirist and politician (died 1729)
May 1 – Joseph Addison, English essayist, poet and politician (died 1719)
August 2 – Johann Jakob Scheuchzer, Swiss paleontologist, historian and travel writer (died 1733)
October 27 – Maria Gustava Gyllenstierna, Swedish writer (died 1737)

Deaths
June 14 – Matthew Wren, English scholar and cleric (born 1629)
June 20 – Alonso Andrada, Spanish biographer and ascetic writer (born 1590)
September 12 – Tanneguy Le Fèvre, French classicist (born 1615)
September 16 – Anne Bradstreet, pioneering American female author (born c. 1612)
November 21 – Robert Creighton, Scottish classicist, politician and bishop (born 1593)
December 27 – Jacques Rohault, French philosopher (born 1618)

References

 
Years of the 17th century in literature